María Mónica Urbina Pugliesse (born August 25, 1967) is a Colombian former model and beauty queen who won Miss Colombia 1985.

Early life 
Urbina, was born in Riohacha, La Guajira, daughter of Enrique Urbina Pinto and Rina Pugliese, the latter daughter of Italian migrants.

Pageantry

Miss Colombia 
Within her responsibilities as Miss Guajira, she competed in the 33rd edition of Miss Colombia along with 18 contestants from different regions of Colombia, on November 11, 1985, in the city of Cartagena, Bolívar, where she was the winner of the night, winning the title of Miss Colombia 1985, being the first time that a representative of La Guajira is Miss Colombia.

Miss Universe 
As Miss Colombia, Urbina competed with 77 contestants in the 35th edition of the Miss Universe pageant, held at the Atlapa Convention Centre in Panama City on July 21, 1986, where she finished as second runner-up.

References

External links
for Miss Colombia website

Miss Colombia winners
Living people

1967 births